USCGC Mendota has been the name of two cutters of the United States Coast Guard:

  a  belonging to the United States Coast Guard from 1929 until 1941. Transferred to Royal Navy as 

United States Coast Guard ship names